Prince Edward County may refer to:

 Prince Edward County, Virginia, United States
 Prince Edward County, Ontario, Canada